The 1997–98 SM-liiga season was the 23rd season of the SM-liiga, the top level of ice hockey in Finland. 12 teams participated in the league, and HIFK Helsinki won the championship.

Standings

Playoffs

Quarterfinals
 Jokerit - Tappara 3:1 (6:3, 5:7, 3:1, 4:0)
 TPS - Kiekko-Espoo 1:3 (5:1, 0:6, 1:4, 1:2)
 HIFK - Ässät 3:0 (5:4, 8:2, 6:3)
 Ilves - SaiPa 3:0 (10:2, 1:0, 5:1)

Semifinals
 HIFK - Kiekko-Espoo 3:0 (3:0, 7:3, 6:0)
 Ilves - Jokerit 3:0 (4:3, 4:2, 3:2)

3rd place
 Jokerit - Kiekko-Espoo 8:0

Final
 HIFK - Ilves 3:0 (2:0, 7:1, 2:1 OT)

Qualification

First round

Second round

External links
 SM-liiga official website

1997–98 in Finnish ice hockey
Finnish
Liiga seasons